The 1906 Springfield Training School football team was an American football team that represented the International Young Men's Christian Association Training School—now known as Springfield College–as an independent during the 1906 college football season. Led by Charles E. Street in his third and final season as head coach, the team compiled a record of 1–5–3.

Schedule

References

Springfield Training School
Springfield Pride football seasons
Springfield Training School football